

492001–492100 

|-bgcolor=#f2f2f2
| colspan=4 align=center | 
|}

492101–492200 

|-id=112
| 492112 Jordicamarasa ||  || Jordi Camarasa (born 1976), a Spanish amateur astronomer who actively provides follow up observations of near-Earth asteroids from Paus Observatory  in Sabadell, Catalonia. || 
|}

492201–492300 

|-bgcolor=#f2f2f2
| colspan=4 align=center | 
|}

492301–492400 

|-bgcolor=#f2f2f2
| colspan=4 align=center | 
|}

492401–492500 

|-bgcolor=#f2f2f2
| colspan=4 align=center | 
|}

492501–492600 

|-bgcolor=#f2f2f2
| colspan=4 align=center | 
|}

492601–492700 

|-bgcolor=#f2f2f2
| colspan=4 align=center | 
|}

492701–492800 

|-bgcolor=#f2f2f2
| colspan=4 align=center | 
|}

492801–492900 

|-bgcolor=#f2f2f2
| colspan=4 align=center | 
|}

492901–493000 

|-bgcolor=#f2f2f2
| colspan=4 align=center | 
|}

References 

492001-493000